José Bonilla (El Tigre, Anzoátegui, 19 November 1967 – 14 June 2002) was a Venezuelan professional boxer. He was a former World Boxing Association (WBA) flyweight (112 lb) champion.

Professional career 
Bonilla turned professional in 1990 and captured the WBA flyweight title in 1996 with a decision win over Saen Sor Ploenchit. He defended it three times before losing to Hugo Rafael Soto by split decision in 1998.

Death 
Bonilla died after an asthma attack on 14 June 2002.

See also 
 List of WBA world champions
 List of Venezuelans

References 

 

1967 births
People from El Tigre
Flyweight boxers
World Boxing Association champions
World flyweight boxing champions
2002 deaths
Venezuelan male boxers
Deaths from asthma